Ibn Bassām or Ibn Bassām al-Shantarinī (1058-1147) was an Arab poet and historian from al-Andalus. He was born in Santarém (sometimes spelled Shantarin or Xantarin) and hailed from the Banu Taghlib tribe. He died in 1147.

Ibn Bassam describes how the incessant invasions of the Castillans forced him to run away from Santarém in Portugal, "the last of the cities of the west," after seeing his lands ravaged and his wealth destroyed, a ruined man with no possessions save his battered sword.

Especially well known is  his  anthology  (The Treasury concerning the Merits of the People of Iberia) one of the most important sources of information in the field of history, literature and culture of the Almoravid dynasty. It was edited in eight volumes by Ihsan Abbas, written in rhymed prose, many of its biographies are contemporary and filled out with details taken from the Kitab al-Matin of Ibn Hayyan. The parts taken from that book are easily distinguishable, because Ibn Bassam prefixes the words qala Ibn Hayyan ("Ibn Hayyan says") and concludes the extract with intaha kalam Ibn Hayyan ("here ends lbn Hayyan's words").

Editions and translations
 ʼAbī ʼal-Ḥasan ʻAlī ibn Bassām ʼal-Shantarīnī, ʼal-Dhakhīrah fī maḥāsin ahl ʼal-Jazīrah, ed. by Iḥsān ʻAbbās, 4 vols in 8 (Bayrūt: Dār ʼal-Thaqāfah, 1978-81), https://al-maktaba.org/book/1035, https://archive.org/details/zakhera_mahasen_jazeera
 'Ibn Bassām, from Al-dhakhīra fī maḥāsin ahl al-Jazīra translation''', trans. by Ross Brann, in Medieval Iberia'', ed. by Remie Constable, 2nd edn (Philadelphia: University of Pennsylvania Press, 2011), pp. 125-27.

References

 

1058 births
1147 deaths
11th-century Arabic poets
12th-century Arabic poets
Poets from al-Andalus
Bassam
Bassam
People from Santarém, Portugal